Adam Arkapaw is an Australian cinematographer. He is best known for his work on the television series Top of the Lake and True Detective, for which he has won two Creative Arts Emmy Awards. He is also known for his collaborations with director Justin Kurzel, whom he worked with on Snowtown, Macbeth, and Assassin's Creed.

Early life
Arkapaw was born in Bowral, a New South Wales town south of Sydney, and attended Bowral High School. He studied at the University of Melbourne's Victorian College of the Arts, graduating in 2006 with a Bachelor of Film and Television.

Career
In addition to numerous short films, Arkapaw photographed three Australian features over the next several years: Animal Kingdom (2010), Snowtown (2011), and Lore (2012). He received a nomination for the AACTA Award for Best Cinematography in 2010 for his work on Animal Kingdom and in 2011 he was named one of Variety magazine's "10 Cinematographers to Watch".

Arkawpaw next worked on Jane Campion's television miniseries Top of the Lake, which was filmed in New Zealand and broadcast in 2013. That year he won a Creative Arts Emmy Award for Outstanding Cinematography for a Miniseries or Movie. In 2014 he won his second Emmy Award, for Outstanding Cinematography for a Single-Camera Series, in recognition of his work on the HBO television series True Detective. True Detective was filmed in Louisiana and Arkapaw's cinematography received wide praise, especially for a six-minute single-take long take that was planned over months and took one and a half days to film.

Arkapaw was the cinematographer of the 2015 film Macbeth, directed by Justin Kurzel, with whom Arkapaw previously worked on Snowtown. He also photographed McFarland, USA, an American sports film released in 2015, and the drama film The Light Between Oceans. He collaborated with Kurzel for a third time on the action-adventure film Assassin's Creed, which was released in the United States in December 2016.

Personal life
He is married to American cinematographer Autumn Durald; the couple has one son, Aedan.

Filmography
Film

Television

Awards

References

External links

Living people
Australian cinematographers
University of Melbourne alumni
People from Bowral
Emmy Award winners
Year of birth missing (living people)